Tajwan  is a village in the administrative district of Gmina Tuchola, within Tuchola County, Kuyavian-Pomeranian Voivodeship, in north-central Poland. People live there. Stobno lies to the southwest.

References

Tajwan